Esteghlal Ahvaz Football Club (Bashgah-e Futbal-e Esteqlâl Ahvaz), commonly known as Esteghlal Ahvaz, was an Iranian football club based in Ahvaz, Khuzestan, that competed in the khuzestan province league The club was founded in 1948 as Taj Ahvaz Football Club.

The football team played their home games at the Takhti Ahvaz which has a seating capacity of 10,000. The club was owned and supported by Mohammad Maleki.

Esteghlal Ahvaz was the oldest existing football club in Ahvaz alongside Shahin Ahvaz and has a large history in Khuzestan football.

History

Establishment
The club was founded as Taj Ahvaz Football Club by Hakim Shoushtari in 1948. The club was one of Taj Tehran branches at the time. From the beginning Taj Ahvaz was able to attract some of the best players of Khuzestan.

Before 1970
Before the 1970s, Iran did not have an official national football league. Most clubs participated in championships of their city or province. In addition to that Taj Ahvaz played in the Khuzestan Premier League until 1970.

1970s
In 1970, the Local League was created. The league included teams from all Iran in different qualifying tournaments. Taj Ahvaz finished first in Group A of their qualifying tournament. After losing the semifinal, Taj Ahvaz defeated Javanan Isfahan 2–0 in the third-place match.

The club also participated in the 1971–72 Local League season. Taj Ahvaz missed again qualification for the final stage after defeating 0–2 by Sepahan in the semifinal of their qualifying tournament. Once again, they achieved third place after a 2–1 win over Tractor.

In 1972, the Takht Jamshid Cup was founded as the national league and included teams from all over the country. Although Taj Ahvaz was promoted to the Takht Jamshid Cup in 1973, the club had to play in the Khuzestan Premier League anymore. Reason therefore was rule by the Iran Football Federation. They allowed only one team of the same name to participate in the league at that time. Taj Tehran played in the league already.

1979 Revolution
After the Islamic Revolution in Iran, Taj Ahvaz changed its name into Esteghlal Ahvaz Football Club. Esteghlal means independence in Persian. After the revolution, any sign of the previous monarchist regime was not tolerated.

1980s and 1990s
Due to the revolution and the Iran–Iraq War, the Takht Jamshid Cup was dissolved and also the lower leagues were unorganized. The war hit Ahvaz and Khuzestan hard. Consequently, the people paid very little attention to the club and football in general at that time. In 1989 the Qods League was created as the national football league, but Esteghlal Ahvaz did not participate.

In 1991 the Azadegan League was formed as the top flight of Iranian football. Esteghlal Ahvaz played eight years in the league with average results. After they finished 13th in the 1997–98 Azadegan League season, Esteghlal Ahvaz relegated to Iran Football's 2nd Division.

2000s
After the Iran Pro League was established as the professional football league of Iran, Azadegan League was declared as the second-highest professional league in the Iranian football league system. Esteghlal Ahvaz won the 2001–02 Azadegan League season and promoted to Iran Pro League.

Due to investment by Ali Shafizadeh, the chairman of the club between 2002 and 2006, Esteghlal Ahvaz had a good team and remained in Iran pro League. They grown in the following years and finished eighth in the 2003–04 Iran Pro League season and fifth one season later.

After they achieved only 12th place in 2005–06 Iran Pro League, Esteghlal Ahvaz finished as runners-up in the 2006–07 season. They continued to be an average team in seasons 2007–08 and 2008–09.

Weak years
Based on a weak performance during 2009–10 Iran Pro League, Esteghlal Ahvaz finished 18th and relegated to Azadegan League. Only one year later they relegated again due to a lot of instability in 2010–11 Azadegan League as they finished 13th. Esteghlal Ahvaz returned to Azadegan League in 2012. They won the 2011–12 Iran 2nd Division after a 4–3 win over PAS Novin Hamedan. Prior to this, they finished first in their group.

Past on two average seasons, Esteghlal Ahvaz relegated again to League 2. They lost their Play-off match against Shahrdari Tabriz 3–3 on aggregate due to away goals.

Promotion and relegation
Although Esteghlal Ahvaz was relegated to League 2, they were able to play in the 2015–16 Persian Gulf Pro League. They get the licence from Foolad Novin, which was actually promoted. Foolad Novin could not promote to Persian Gulf Pro League as they are the reserve side of Foolad Khuzestan. However the team was mismanaged and they were relegated back to the Azadegan League several games before the end of the season.

Because of a very poor performance in the 2016–17 Azadegan League season, Esteghlal Ahvaz relegated to League 2 without winning a single match.

Stadium

Esteghlal Ahvaz plays their home games at the Takhti Ahvaz which has a seating capacity of 10,000. The stadium was opened in 1978 and is owned by the Municipality of Ahvaz. The stadium was renovated in 2005 and 2012. It is also the home venue of local rival Shahin Ahvaz. In the past also Esteghlal Khuzestan and Foolad played their home matches there.

Furthermore, Esteghlal Ahvaz played two matches in the 2015–16 Persian Gulf Pro League season at Ghadir. They played also their Hazfi Cup match in this season there.

Average attendances

Notes:Matches with spectator bans are not included in average attendances

Supporters
Esteghlal Ahvaz was for a long time the second highest supported team in Ahvaz after local rival Foolad. Before the foundation of Foolad in 1971, Esteghlal Ahvaz was the highest supported team in Ahvaz. Due to the Iran–Iraq War, the people paid very little attention to the club and football in general in the 1980s. Later, the fans comes back and the club had a good support in the 1990s and 2000s, even though Foolad was now the highest supported club in the city.

Based on weak years between 2010 and 2015, the club has to fight with falling attendance numbers and sinking popularity. After Esteghlal Khuzestan won the 2015–16 Persian Gulf Pro League sensational, it seems that Esteghlal Ahvaz is only the third highest supported team in the city now.

Last but not least the fans stands out negative sometimes. For instance the fans thrown stones in a match against Persepolis on 22 April 2016. As a result of this, Esteghlal Ahvaz had to play three matches with spectator bans.

Rivalries
Esteghlal Ahvaz' main rival is Foolad. The club has also smaller rivalries with Esteghlal Khuzestan and Shahin Ahvaz.

Ahvaz Derby
Esteghlal Ahvaz' longest-running and deepest rivalry is with the other major club in Ahvaz, Foolad Khuzestan. Matches between the two clubs are referred to as the Ahvaz Derby. Before the foundation of Foolad in 1971, Esteghlal Ahvaz was the highest supported team in Ahvaz. Foolad became the highest supported club in the city in the 1990s. The rivalry is based on sporting competition to be the best club in the city. Although Foolad represents the Arab minority of Ahvaz, while the supporters of Esteghlal Ahvaz are primarily Persians, there is no any ethnic rivalry in the derby. After weak seasons of Esteghlal Ahvaz in the past, the derby lost in importance.

Further rivalries
Other smaller rivalries within Ahvaz include those with Esteghlal Khuzestan and Shahin Ahvaz. The rivalry with Shahin Ahvaz is based on the fact, that these two teams are the oldest existing football clubs in Ahvaz. Similar to the Ahvaz Derby, also the rivalry with Shahin Ahvaz lost in importance since the clubs are playing in different leagues for many years.

Seasons
The table below chronicles the achievements of Esteghlal Ahvaz in various competitions since 1970.

Notes:The Persian Gulf Pro League was formerly known as Iran Pro League (IPL) and Persian Gulf Cup (PGC)  The Azadegan League was the highest division between 1991 and 2001  The League 2 was formerly known as Iran 2nd Division  The League 3 was formerly known as Iran 3rd Division

Honours

Domestic
 Persian Gulf Pro League
Runners–up (1): 2006–07
  Azadegan League
Winners (1): 2001–02
  League 2
Winners (1): 2011–12

Players

First team squad

For recent transfers, see List of Iranian football transfers summer 2016''.

Coaches

Coaches since 1993

Club chairmen

Chairmen since 2002

See also
 Esteghlal Tehran
 Esteghlal Khuzestan
 FC Istiklol
 2016–17 Azadegan League
 2016-17 Hazfi Cup

References

External links
  Official club website
  Khuzestan Football Association

Esteghlal Ahvaz F.C.
Football clubs in Iran
Association football clubs established in 1948
Football clubs in Ahvaz
1948 establishments in Iran